Leon Spencer (November 1, 1945 – March 11, 2012) was an American jazz organist from Houston, Texas. He played piano with David Newman and organ with Melvin Sparks. Spencer recorded for Prestige in the early 1970s with Buddy Caldwell, Idris Muhammad, Melvin Sparks, and Grover Washington Jr.

Discography

As leader
 Sneak Preview! (Prestige, 1970; reissued as Legends Of Acid Jazz: Leon Spencer, 1997)
 Louisiana Slim (Prestige, 1971; reissued as Legends Of Acid Jazz: Leon Spencer, 1997)
 Bad Walking Woman (Prestige, 1972)
 Where I'm Coming From (Prestige, 1973)

As sideman
With Rusty Bryant
 Fire Eater (Prestige, 1971; reissued as Legends Of Acid Jazz: Rusty Bryant, Vol. 2, 1999) 
With Karl Denson
 Dance Lesson #2 (Blue Note, 2001)
With Lou Donaldson
 Pretty Things (Blue Note, 1970)
 The Scorpion: Live at The Cadillac Club (Blue Note, 1970 [rel. 1995])
 Cosmos (Blue Note, 1971)
With Wilbert Longmire
 Revolution (World Pacific, 1969)
 This Side of Heaven (J&M, 1976) 
With Melvin Sparks
 Sparks! (Prestige, 1970; reissued as Legends Of Acid Jazz: Melvin Sparks, 1996)
 Spark Plug (Prestige, 1971; reissued as Legends Of Acid Jazz: Melvin Sparks, 1996)
 Akilah! (Prestige, 1972)
With Sonny Stitt 
 Turn It On! (Prestige, 1971; reissued as Legends Of Acid Jazz: Sonny Stitt, 1996)
 You Talk That Talk! Gene Ammons & Sonny Stitt (Prestige, 1971; reissued as Legends Of Acid Jazz: Gene Ammons, 1997)
 Black Vibrations (Prestige, 1971; reissued as Legends Of Acid Jazz: Sonny Stitt, 1996)

References

1945 births
2012 deaths
Acid jazz organists
Soul-jazz organists
Hard bop organists
American jazz organists
American male organists
Prestige Records artists
American male jazz musicians